Michael Wendler (born Michael Skowronek, 22 June 1972; legal name after his marriage in 2009 Michael Norberg; also known as Der Wendler) is a German pop singer, television personality and conspiracy theorist. Since his breakthrough in 1998, he has won several awards such as the prestigious Crown of the Folk Music 2012. He has been under contract with Sony Entertainment for many years and has a total of six gold records and one platinum. Wendler also writes songs and lyrics for other Schlager singers under the pseudonym Mic Skowy.

Life 
Wendler was born in Dinslaken. He is of Polish origin. In March 2009, he married his partner of many years, Claudia Norberg in a civil wedding on Sylt and in April 2009 had a church wedding on Mallorca. He sold the image rights to the wedding to women's magazine Die Neue.

On 9 January 2010, he was presented with the Crown of Folk Music Award. He settled in Dinslaken, building a compound with horse stables, which was completed at the end of 2010.

In September 2011, Wendler and Markus Krampe opened the "Nina", a discothèque in Bottrop, where pop artists perform live. Another offshoot of the successful nightclub was opened in Cologne.

In 2016, Wendler moved his family to Cape Coral, Florida, where he continues to write and perform in both the US and Germany.

In 2020, he separated from Claudia Norberg and married 18-year-old Laura Müller. She left school without graduating and decided to move to Florida with him.

TV appearances 
In January 2010, The Wendler Clan was aired on the popular German television network Sat.1 in a six-part reality soap broadcast featuring Wendler. In January 2014, Wendler took part in German reality show Ich bin ein Star – Holt mich hier raus! on the RTL (TV network). In 2015, he participated in the TV show Ich bin ein Star – Lasst mich wieder rein! Although he was injured during the taping of an episode and had to pull out, he still got the most votes in the final show. He was hurt in a bungee cord accident and broke his right wrist suffering a compound fracture, which required an emergency operation. From 15 August 2014 to 29 August 2014, Wendler participated in the Promi Big Brother reality programme and finished in fifth place. In 2021, he was a judge in talent show Deutschland sucht den Superstar. Due to conspirancy theories about the COVID-19 pandemic, he left the panel after the auditions were filmed. After being criticized again for his views, the broadcaster decided to cut the singer out of all episodes.

Conspiracy theories 
In 2020, Wendler was the centre of a public debate due to his remarks about the COVID-19 pandemic. He accused the German government of 'gross and severe violations' of the constitution. He suggested that all German TV channels, including RTL (whom he worked for), were gleichgeschaltet (a term associated with Nazi Germany) and politically controlled. He urged his followers to create a Telegram account, claiming that this would be the only opportunity to exchange views without censorship. Following the introduction of more restrictive policies to reduce the spread of COVID-19 in January 2021, Wendler compared the German state with a concentration camp.

Discography

Albums 
 Best Of – Vol. I (2008)
 Respekt (2009)

Singles 
 Das ist ja wohl ein Ding (2001)
 Das haut mich um (2001)
 Nicht mehr in diesem Leben (2001)
 Dein kleiner Prinz (2001)
 Alibi (2002)
 Außer Kontrolle (2002)
 Verlier sie nie (2002)
 Oh lieber Gott (2003)
 Seitensprünge (2003)
 Warum lügen die Sterne (2003)
 Traue keinem über 30 (2004)
 Unsterblich (2004)
 Marterpfahl (2004)
 Zauberer (2004)
 Sie liebt den DJ (2005)
 Wenn alle Stricke reißen (2005)
 180 Grad  (2005)
 Heuchler (2006)
 Prinzessin (2006)
 Mein letztes Gebet (2007)
 Das schönste Girl der Welt (2007)
 Sie liebt den DJ (2007)
 Dennoch liebst du mich (2007)
 Nina (2008)
 Echolot (2008)
 Häschenparty (2008) (with Schnuffel)
 Ich denk an Weihnachten (2008)  (production by Luis Rodriguez)
 I Don't Know (2009)
 Nina – Reloaded (2009)
 Wer weiß warum (2010)
 Piloten wie wir (2010)
 Wir sind Tänzer (2011)
 Sie liebt ihn immer noch (DJ Teil 2)/In the Heat of the Night (2011)
 Was wäre wenn (July 2012)
 Nie mehr (February 2013)
 Honey Kiss (April 2013) (with Anika)
 Unser Zelt auf Westerland (January 2014)
 Die Maske fällt (2015)
 Wie beim ersten Mal (2016)
 Gut, dass Männer nie weinen (2017)
 Wir war'n, wir sind, wir bleiben (2017)
 Egal (2017)
 Was soll ich im Himmel (2019)
 Was man liebt, gibt man frei'' (2020)

Autobiography

References

External links 

Schlager musicians
People from Wesel (district)
1972 births
Living people
21st-century German  male singers
Ich bin ein Star – Holt mich hier raus! participants
German expatriates in the United States
German conspiracy theorists